Elizabeth Coulson (née Jelfs; born 28 July 1976) is a British former professional tennis player.

Biography

Tennis career
Jelfs, who is originally from Banbury, won the girls' doubles title at the 1994 Wimbledon Championships. She and South African partner Nannie de Villiers defeated Corina Morariu and Ludmila Varmužová in the final. The same pair were also runner-up in the girls' doubles at the 1995 US Open.

In 1995 she appeared in the main draw of three WTA Tour tournaments in the lead up to Wimbledon. She qualified as a lucky loser for the singles at the British Clay Court Championships, then received a wildcard into the doubles at Birmingham with Karen Cross, before winning her way through qualifying to play singles in Eastbourne. On the back of these performances, she was granted a wildcard spot into the 1995 Wimbledon Championships and was beaten in the first round by Christina Singer. Later in the year, she surpassed Clare Wood as Britain's top-ranked female player.

She played again at Wimbledon in 1998 when she featured in the mixed doubles, partnering Jamie Delgado. They made the second round, with a win over Francisco Montana and Caroline Schneider.

Personal life
Now known by her married name, Coulson, she studied Sports Science/Recreational Management at Loughborough University and has worked as an events manager.

ITF Circuit finals

Singles: 4 (4 runner-ups)

Doubles: 15 (12 titles, 3 runner-ups)

References

External links
 
 

1976 births
Living people
British female tennis players
English female tennis players
Wimbledon junior champions
Sportspeople from Banbury
Tennis people from Oxfordshire
Grand Slam (tennis) champions in girls' doubles